Boing is a French pay television channel aimed at children and teenagers, which launched on 8 April 2010. On 2 February 2023, it was announced that Boing would transition to Cartoonito full-time on 3 April, and also be known as Cartoonito after that date.

History

As Boing (2010–2023) 
Boing was launched on 3 April 2010 as a block on Gulli and as a channel on 8 April 2010. Its programming consisted of reruns from Cartoon Network shows. While Cartoon Network is exclusively on Canalsat and cable, Boing was available on ISPs. Boing joined Numericable on 18 August 2011 and Canalsat on 15 September 2011. On 10 January 2023, the channel ceased broadcasting on Canal+ after retransmission consent negotiation for WBD channels was unsuccessful.

As Cartoonito (2023–present) 
Boing once carried a Cartoonito-branded block between 3 September 2011 to 5 July 2013.

In May 2021, it was announced that there were plans to relaunch Cartoonito within the region around Spring 2022, with HBO Max. On 2 February 2023, it was confirmed that Boing would transition to a new branding of Cartoonito on 3 April 2023.

Programming 
The network programming initially targeted a family audience, as Boing with reruns of Cartoon Network, Boomerang and Toonami, and films. Cartoon Network's international acquisitions aired on Boing, while Cartoon Network France focuses on Cartoon Network Originals. Boing France co-produced some French shows (Zorro, the Chronicles, Chronokids, and Miss Moon) and made a mini-series: JuMo.

Current programming

Original programming 
Adventure Time (Finn et Jake)
Be Cool, Scooby-Doo! (Trop cool, Scooby-Doo !)
Ben 10 (2016)
Bunnicula
Clarence
Craig of the Creek (Craig de la Crique)
DC Super Hero Girls
Justice League Action (La Ligue des Justiciers : Action)
LazyTown
Uncle Grandpa (Oncle Grandpa)
Mighty Magiswords (Les Épées Méga-Magiques)
What's New, Scooby-Doo? (Quoi d'neuf Scooby-Doo ?)
Dorothy and the Wizard of Oz (Le Magicien d'Oz : Dorothy et Amis)
The Powerpuff Girls (2016) (Les Super Nanas)
Scooby-Doo! Mystery Incorporated (Scooby-Doo : Mystères Associés)
Scooby-Doo and Guess Who? (Scooby-Doo et Compagnie)

Acquired programming 
Angry Birds Toons
Big Blue
Blaze and the Monster Machines
The Epic Tales of Captain Underpants (Les Aventures Extraordinaires de Capitaine Superslip)
Chuck's Choice (Chuck, Fais Ton Choix !)
Cloudy with a Chance of Meatballs (Tempête de Boulettes Géantes)
Chuggington
Digimon Universe: App Monsters (Digimon Appmon)
Dr. Dimensionpants (Dr. Pantastique)
DreamWorks Dragons (Dragons : Cavaliers de Beurk)
Johnny Test
The Jungle Bunch (Les As de la Jungle)
Littlest Pet Shop
My Little Pony: Friendship Is Magic
Mixels
Ninjago: Masters of Spinjitzu (Ninjago)
Space Racers
Supernoobs
Totally Spies!
The Tales of Wonder Keepers
Yo-Kai Watch

Upcoming programming

Original programming 

 Baby Looney Tunes 
 Bugs Bunny Builders (Bugs Bunny Constructeurs)

Acquired programming 

 Interstellar Ella
 Kingdom Force (Kingdom Force, la force des royaumes)
 Lucas the Spider (Lucas l'Araignée)
 Go Jetters
 Moley
 Thomas & Friends: All Engines Go (Thomas et ses amis)
 True and the Rainbow Kingdom (Talia et le Royaume Arc-en-ciel)

References

External links 
 Official site 

2010 establishments in France
Boing (TV channel)
Children's television networks
Television stations in France
French-language television stations
Television channels and stations established in 2010
Turner Broadcasting System France
Warner Bros. Discovery EMEA